Alkhadzhakent (Alxocagent) is a rural locality (a selo) and the administrative centre of Alkhadzhakentsky Selsoviet, Kayakentsky District, Republic of Dagestan, Russia. The population was 2,411 as of 2010. There are 25 streets.

Geography 
Alkhadzhakent is located 23 km southwest of Izberbash. Mamaaul and Usemikent are the nearest rural localities.

Nationalities 
Kumyks live there.

Famous residents 
 Sheykh Ismailov (Doctor of Biological Sciences)

References 

Rural localities in Kayakentsky District